The 2005 EPD Tour, titled as the 2005 Renault EPD Tour for sponsorship reasons, was the ninth season of the EPD Tour, one of four third-tier tours recognised by the European Tour.

Schedule
The following table lists official events during the 2005 season.

Order of Merit
The Order of Merit was based on prize money won during the season, calculated in Euros. The top five players on the tour (not otherwise exempt) earned status to play on the 2006 Challenge Tour.

Notes

References

EPD Tour